Malżyce  is a village in the administrative district of Gmina Czarnocin, within Kazimierza County, Świętokrzyskie Voivodeship, in south-central Poland. As of 2011, the village had 93 males and 73 females, for a total population of 169 people.

References

Villages in Kazimierza County